Eye to Ear II is a studio album by English guitarist, composer and improvisor Fred Frith. It is a collection of film music composed and performed by Frith, and is the second of three Eye to Ear albums dedicated to his work for short films. It was recorded in Germany and the United States between 1997 and 2003.

The music on Eye to Ear II appeared in the following films:
Gambling, Gods and LSD (2002) by Peter Mettler
Returning Home (2003) by Andy Abrahams Wilson
Hirschen Mit Goldenen Hufen by Petra Mäussnest
Sideshow by Kristin Varner

A modified version of the track "Gambling, Gods and LSD" also appeared on the soundtrack of the film of the same name, Gambling, Gods and LSD (2003) by various artists.

Track listing
All tracks by Fred Frith except where noted.

"Sideshow 1" – 2:07
"Gambling, Gods and LSD" – 14:19
"Sideshow 2" – 2:26
"Hirschen Mit Goldenen Hufen" – 7:53
"Sideshow 3" – 2:19
"Returning Home: Wood and Water" – 8:34
"Returning Home: The Wind" (Frith, Wu Fei) – 4:11
"Returning Home: Straw Dance" – 3:17
"Sideshow 4" – 2:18

Personnel

Fred Frith – guitars, bass guitar, piano, keyboards, violin, accordion, ocarina, kalimba, drum samples, Mobius instruments, toys, low-grade sound effects, voice
Gail Brand – trombone (5)
Heather Heise – accordion (6-8)
Wu Fei – gu zheng (6-8)
Anne Hege – voice (6-8)
Tracks 1,3,5 and 9 recorded at Guerrilla Recordings, Oakland, United States, January–February 2002
Track 2 recorded at Jankowski Studio, Esslingen, Germany, July 2001
Track 4 recorded at Ludwigsburg Film Akademie, Ludwigsburg, Germany, 1997
Tracks 6-8 recorded at Mobius Music, San Francisco, United States, January 2003
Myles Boisen – engineer
Oliver di Cicco – engineer, instrument design, instrument technician
Peter Hardt – engineer, compilation, editing
Scott Hull – mastering
Fred Frith – audio production, compilation
Kazunori Sugiyama – associate producer
John Zorn – executive producer
Heike Liss – photography
Heung-Heung "Chippy" Chin – design

References

External links

2004 albums
Fred Frith albums
Tzadik Records albums
Albums produced by Fred Frith